James Levin Latchum (December 23, 1918 – January 31, 2004) was a United States district judge of the United States District Court for the District of Delaware.

Education and career

Born in Milford, Delaware, Latchum received an Artium Baccalaureus degree from Princeton University in 1940, and was a captain in the United States Army following World War II from 1940 to 1946. He received a Bachelor of Laws from the University of Virginia School of Law in 1946. He was a lieutenant colonel in the United States Army Reserve during World War II, from 1946 to 1961. He was in private practice in Wilmington, Delaware from 1946 to 1968. He was an attorney at the Delaware State Highway Department from 1949 to 1951. He was an Assistant United States Attorney of the District of Delaware from 1951 to 1953. He was an attorney at the Delaware Interstate Highway Division from 1955 to 1963. He was an attorney at the Delaware River and Bay Authority from 1963 to 1968.

Federal judicial service

Latchum was nominated by President Lyndon B. Johnson on July 17, 1968, to a seat  on the United States District Court for the District of Delaware vacated by Judge Caleb Rodney Layton III. He was confirmed by the United States Senate on August 2, 1968, and received his commission on August 3, 1968. He served as Chief Judge from 1973 to 1983. He assumed senior status on December 23, 1983. Latchum served in that capacity until his death on January 31, 2004.

Personal

At the time of his death, Latchum had been married to Elizabeth Murray McArthur for 60 years.

References

Sources
 

1918 births
2004 deaths
Judges of the United States District Court for the District of Delaware
United States district court judges appointed by Lyndon B. Johnson
20th-century American judges
People from Milford, Delaware
United States Army officers
Assistant United States Attorneys
United States Army personnel of World War II